Barking is a village and civil parish in the Mid Suffolk district of the English county of Suffolk. The village is linear along the road with its centre being around the area known as Barking Tye and away from the large village church of St Mary.
There are six bells that hang the church of St Mary with the largest weighing 11 cwt - 1 qr - 7 lb. All 6 bells were recast and rehung in 1911 by Alfred Bowell.

Barking Woods is a Site of Special Scientific Interest made up of a number of wooded areas mainly to the south of the village. One of the sites has active badger setts.

References

External links

 

Villages in Suffolk
Mid Suffolk District
Civil parishes in Suffolk